The 4th Reconnaissance Group is an inactive United States Air Force unit. It was last assigned to Thirteenth Air Force and was stationed at Clark Field, Philippines. It was inactivated on 15 January 1946.

The unit operated P-38/F-4 Lightning photo-reconnaissance aircraft in the Pacific Theater of World War II over a wide area. The group, based successively on New Caledonia, Espiritu Santo, Guadalcanal, and Morotai, flew reconnaissance missions over enemy territory to supply air force units with target and damage- assessment photographs and to provide army and navy units with intelligence on Japanese troop concentrations, installations, shore defenses, supply routes, and shipping. It also produced maps of Allied and enemy-held territory and prepared navigation charts for US units.

During the last three months of the war the group photographed Japanese positions and installations on Mindanao and Borneo to aid US and Australian operations.

History

Lineage
 Constituted as 4th Photographic Group on 14 July 1942
 Activated on 23 July 1942
 Redesignated 4th Photographic Reconnaissance and Mapping Group on 15 May 1943
 Redesignated 4th Photographic Group (Reconnaissance) in November 1943
 Redesignated 4th Reconnaissance Group on 4 May 1945
 Inactivated on 15 January 1946
 Disbanded on 6 March 1947
 Reconstituted on 31 July 1985 and redesignated 534th Combat Crew Training Group (not active)

Assignments
 Second Air Force, 23 July – 24 October 1942
 Thirteenth Air Force, 22 November 1942 – 15 January 1946

Components
 17th Photographic Reconnaissance Squadron, 23 July 1942 – 15 January 1946
 18th Combat Mapping Squadron (1942–46)
 19th Photographic Reconnaissance Squadron, 23 July 1942 – 15 January 1946
 20th Reconnaissance Squadron, 23 July 1942 – 15 January 1946
 38th Photographic Reconnaissance Squadron, 23 July 1942 – 15 January 1946

Stations
 Colorado Springs AAFd., Colorado 23 July – 24 October 1942
 Plaine Des Gaiacs Airfield, New Caledonia, Melanesia, 22 November 1942
 Pekoa Airfield, Espiritu Santo, New Hebrides, 22 January 1943
 Carney Airfield, Guadalcanal, Solomon Islands, 6 May 1944
 Wama Airfield, Morotai, Netherlands East Indies, 12 December 1944
 Clark Field, Luzon, Philippines, September 1945-15 January 1946

Aircraft
 F-5 Lightning
 F-10 Mitchell

References

Notes

Bibliography

 Maurer, Maurer (1983). Air Force Combat Units of World War II. Maxwell AFB, Alabama: Office of Air Force History. .

See also

Military units and formations established in 1942
004